Industrial Water Cooling (IWC) is a manufacturer of cooling towers in South Africa. The company’s headquarters are in Isando, Johannesburg.

The company primarily supplies cooling towers to the following industrial sectors: power generation; mining; petrochemical industries; sugar; steel; food & beverage; air-conditioning and refrigeration.

The company has undertaken projects for companies such as Sasol, ArcelorMittal, Foskor, and Eskom.

History
IWC was founded in 1986. In September 2011, the South Africa-based private equity investment management company, Medu Capital, acquired a 62% equity interest in the company.

In 2013, IWC entered into an agreement with Danish plate heat exchanger manufacturer Sondex to supply its replacement plates and gaskets in sub-Saharan Africa.

In the same year IWC opened a glass-reinforced plastic manufacturing facility in Isando, Ekuhleni, one of only two GRP plants of this kind in South Africa.

Acquisitions
In August 2014, IWC announced the acquisition of Tektower, formerly known as Sulzer Cooling, a South African-based cooling tower manufacturer, to expand its African operations.  Tektower now operates as a subsidiary of IWC.

In September 2014, the company acquired the Vectus Pipe system from Fiberpipe; a pipe system manufactured from glass fibre reinforced polyester and vinylester and widely used in the oil and gas, shipbuilding and offshore industries.

References

Construction and civil engineering companies of South Africa
Manufacturing companies based in Johannesburg